Enrica Marasca (born 10 March 1983) is an Italian lightweight rower twice bronze medal winner at senior level at the World Rowing Championships.

Achievements

References

External links
 
 Enrica Marasca at Italian Rowing Federation

1983 births
Living people
Italian female rowers
World Rowing Championships medalists for Italy
Rowers of Gruppo Sportivo Forestale
Rowers of Marina Militare
Sportspeople from the Province of Latina